The Men's 50 km Race Walk at the 1984 Summer Olympics in Los Angeles, California had an entry list of 31 competitors. Five athletes were disqualified, while nine walkers did not finish the race, held on August 11, 1984.

Medalists

Abbreviations

Final ranking

See also
 1982 Men's European Championships 50 km Walk (Athens)
 1983 Men's World Championships 50 km Walk (Helsinki)
 1984 Men's Friendship Games 50 km Walk (Moscow)
 1984 Race Walking Year Ranking
 1986 Men's European Championships 50 km Walk (Stuttgart)
 1987 Men's World Championships 50 km Walk (Rome)

References

External links
 Results

 5
Racewalking at the Olympics
Men's events at the 1984 Summer Olympics